GM – The Independent Fantasy Roleplaying Magazine was first published in September 1988 by Croftward Publishing.  The editorial team of Tim Metcalfe, Paul Boughton and Wayne worked together previously on Computer and Video Games magazine.

History
GM ran for nineteen issues until March 1990 when Croftward Publishing went into liquidation.  Metcalfe, Boughton and Wayne later became associate editors for GamesMaster International, published by Newsfield.

Content
Content varied in each issue but normally covered a wide range of roleplaying activities including role-playing games (RPG), computer RPGs, play-by-mail, live action role-playing, board games, fantasy films, fantasy novels and solo roleplay books, miniature figures as well as scenarios, game playing hints and tips, short stories, interviews and much more.

Terry Pratchett's short story "Final Reward" was originally published in the October 1988 issue. Pratchett also contributed to the eleventh issue, in July 1989, in a section titled “Pratchett’s Points”. This ran for sixteen pages, though how much of it was written by Pratchett himself is unclear. It included an eleven-page section about “Adventuring in the Discworld” by Kevin Puttick, a map of Ankh-Morpork (predating The Streets of Ankh-Morpork by four years), and an edited extract from Pyramids presented as a one-page short story called “The Test”.

David Langford was a regular contribitor with his book review column "Critical Hits", a continuation of the column he wrote for White Dwarf.

References

Defunct magazines published in the United Kingdom
Magazines established in 1988
Magazines disestablished in 1990
Role-playing game magazines